Paulo Mendes da Rocha (October 25, 1928 – May 23, 2021) was a Brazilian architect.

Mendes da Rocha attended the Mackenzie Presbyterian University College of Architecture, graduating in 1954. Working almost exclusively in Brazil, Mendes da Rocha began designing  buildings in 1957, many of them built in concrete, a method some call "Brazilian Brutalism", arguably allowing buildings to be constructed cheaply and quickly. He  contributed many notable cultural buildings to São Paulo and is widely credited with having enhanced and revitalized the city.

Mendes da Rocha was a professor at the Architecture College of University of São Paulo, known as FAU-USP, until 1998. His work was influenced by Brazilian architect Vilanova Artigas, from the paulist Brazilian School.  He was honored with the Mies van der Rohe Prize (2000), the Pritzker Prize (2006), and the Venice Biennale Golden Lion for lifetime achievement (2016).

Mendes da Rocha died on May 23, 2021, in São Paulo at the age of 92.

Major works

Gallery

References

Sources
Artigas, Rosa: "Paulo Mendes da Rocha", Cosac & Naify
Spiro, Annette: "Paulo Mendes da Rocha. Works and Projects".
VAZ MILHEIRO, Ana; TAVARES, Gonçalo M.; SIMÕES, João Carmo. Paulo Mendes da Rocha: Museu Nacional dos Coches. Monade, Lisboa, 2015.
"Designed Future or Selected Writings by Paulo Mendes da Rocha", monade, Lisboa, 2019 (English version)

External links

Pritzker Prize – profile
CityMayors.com profile
New York Times profile
NPR profile
Objekto

1928 births
2021 deaths
Brazilian architects
Brutalist architects
Mackenzie Presbyterian University alumni
Academic staff of the University of São Paulo
Architecture educators
Pritzker Architecture Prize winners
People from São Paulo (state)
Recipients of the Order of Cultural Merit (Brazil)